Oakdale High School is a senior high school in downtown Oakdale, Louisiana, United States. The current structure was established in 1923. OHS is a part of the Allen Parish School Board and opened in 1923.

Athletics
Oakdale High athletics competes in the LHSAA.

References

External links
Oakdale High School

1923 establishments in Louisiana
Educational institutions established in 1923
Public high schools in Louisiana
Schools in Allen Parish, Louisiana